"Not About Us" is the third and final single from Genesis' 15th album Calling All Stations. It reached No. 66 in UK and No. 81 in Germany. It was the last single to feature vocalist Ray Wilson.

Music video
A music video for the single was made.

Track listing
Not About Us CD1
 "Not About Us" (radio edit) – 4:04
 "Anything Now" (Non-Album Track) – 6:58
 "Sign Your Life Away" (Non-Album Track) – 4:44
 "Run Out of Time" (Non-Album Track) – 6:07
Total length: 21:53
Not About Us CD2
 "Not About Us" – 4:38
 "Dancing with the Moonlit Knight" (acoustic)
 "Follow You Follow Me" (acoustic)
 "Not About Us" (acoustic)

Personnel
Tony Banks: keyboards, guitar (acoustic tracks on CD2)
Mike Rutherford: guitar, bass
Ray Wilson: vocals
Additional personnel:
Nir Z: drums
Nick D'Virgilio: drums on "Sign Your Life Away"
Anthony Drennan: guitar (acoustic tracks on CD2)

References

Genesis (band) songs
1998 singles
1997 songs
Virgin Records singles
Songs written by Tony Banks (musician)
Songs written by Mike Rutherford